Wetarese is an Austronesian language of Wetar, an island in the south Maluku, Indonesia, and of the nearby islands Liran and Atauro, the latter island separate from the mainland of East Timor, north of Dili.

Background
The four identified principal varieties of Wetarese on Wetar – Aputai, Iliʼuun, Parai and Tugun – are distinct enough that some may consider them to be different languages. Half of Wetarese speakers live on the island of Atauro in East Timor, where three closely related dialects (presumably of Iliuun) are spoken: Rahesuk (Rasua) in the center, Resuk (Hresuk) in the southeast, and Adabe (Raklungu) in the southwest. Dadua in the extreme north is a subdialect of Rahesuk, and has been reported to be intelligible with the Iliuun of Liran Island. About half the Dadua population has moved to Timor, on the coast of Manatuto district, where it has undergone influence from Galoli.

Wetarese is closely related to Galoli, spoken on the north coast of East Timor and by an immigrant community on the south coast of Wetar.

"language"
The Raklungu dialect of Atauro, or Kluun Hahan Adabe, was mistaken for a Papuan language by Antonio de Almeida (1966) and reported as "Adabe" in Wurm & Hattori (1981). Many subsequent sources propagated this error, showing a Papuan language on Atauro Island. Geoffrey Hull, director of research for the Instituto Nacional de Linguística in East Timor, describes only Wetarese being spoken on Ataúro Island, and was unable to find any evidence of a non-Austronesian language there.

Phonology 
The following represents the Tugun dialect:

Consonants 

  only occurs in word-medial positions.

Vowels 

Citations

References

External links
Survey of languages of East Timor

Timor–Babar languages
Languages of East Timor
Languages of the Maluku Islands